Qaisar Hameed (born 1 July 1950) is a former Iraqi football midfielder who played for Iraq in the 1974 Asian Games. He played for Iraq between 1970 and 1975

References

Iraqi footballers
Iraq international footballers
Footballers at the 1974 Asian Games
Association football midfielders
1950 births
Living people
Asian Games competitors for Iraq